Hellenopolis was also a name of Harran in the ancient province of Syria.
Hellenopolis was a city in Anatolia (perhaps Bithynia or Mysia) founded by an Attalus, by gathering together the inhabitants of a number of Greek cities.

References
The Hellenistic settlements in Europe, the islands, and Asia Minor By Getzel M. Cohen Page 397 

Attalid colonies